Brezje is a small settlement in the Municipality of Sveti Jurij ob Ščavnici in northeastern Slovenia. The area is part of the traditional Styria region and is now included in the Mura Statistical Region.

Notable people
Notable people that were born or lived in Brezje include:
Fran Ilešič (1871–1941), literary historian

References

External links
Brezje at Geopedia

Populated places in the Municipality of Sveti Jurij ob Ščavnici